The Denis Julien Inscription is a rock-carved graffito purportedly left by French- American trapper Denis Julien in southern Utah when he was traveling in the area in the late 1830s or early 1840s, one of the first Europeans to enter the area.  The inscription is within the boundaries of Canyonlands National Park, on the bank of the Colorado River. The inscription reads:

Denis Julian
MAIZ
    1836' 

The misspelling of "Julien" has led to doubts about its authenticity.  One interpretation is that the apparent "a" is a script "e." The inscription was listed on the National Register of Historic Places on October 7, 1988.

The inscription is one of at least eight that Julien left in Utah between 1831 and 1844.

See also
 Julien Inscription Panel, a similar inscription in Arches National Park more firmly attributed to Julien.
 Denis Julien Inscription (Grand County, Utah), more firmly attributed to Julien
 Denis Julien Inscription (Moffat County, Colorado) in Dinosaur National Monument

References

National Register of Historic Places in San Juan County, Utah
National Register of Historic Places in Canyonlands National Park